The 2009–10 Creighton Bluejays men's basketball team represented Creighton University in the 2009–10 NCAA Division I men's basketball season. Led by head coach Dana Altman in his 16th and subsequently final season as he would take the job at Oregon following the season. Creighton would then hire Greg McDermott as his successor. In 2009–10, the Bluejays would end the regular season with a record of 16–15 and despite losing in the first round of the Missouri Valley Conference tournament, they would qualify for the CIT and make their way to the semifinal round before losing to eventual champion Missouri State.

Postseason

2010 Missouri Valley Conference men's basketball tournament
3/5/10 Vs. Bradley @ Scottrade Center L, 62-81
2010 CollegeInsider.com Postseason Tournament
3/16/10 Vs. South Dakota @ Qwest Center Omaha W, 89-78
3/22/10 Vs. Fairfield @ Qwest Center Omaha W, 73-55
3/24/10 Vs. Missouri State @ JQH Arena L, 65-78

References

Creighton Bluejays men's basketball seasons
Creighton
Creighton
Creighton Bluejays Men's Basketball
Creighton Bluejays Men's Basketball